Fatal accidents to competitors at the Brands Hatch Circuit during national and international  motor-sport events.

List of fatal accidents involving competitors

List of fatal accidents involving race officials

List of fatal accidents during unofficial testing

Sources

Brands
Brands Hatch